The Agência Nacional de Inovação (National Innovation Agency) is a Portuguese government agency funded by the Ministry of Science, Technology and Higher Education and the Ministry of the Economy and Innovation. The agency tries to promote innovation and technological development and to facilitate cooperation between research and industry.

See also
 Science and technology in Portugal

External links
 Official website

References

Innovation organizations
Science and technology in Portugal
Research institutes in Portugal